Honda CB500 may refer to several Honda middle-weight motorcycles:

Honda CB500 Four (1971-1973)
Honda CB500T (1975-1976)
Honda CB500 twin (1993-2003)
Honda 500 twins since 2013

See also 
 Honda CB series